Paloma Sánchez-Garnica (born 1962) is a Spanish writer. She is the winner of the Fernando Lara Novel Award 2016 and the runner-up for Premio Planeta de Novela 2021.

Early life and education 
Paloma Sánchez-Garnica was born in 1962, in Madrid, and grew up in Zaragoza. She studied law, geography and history.

Career 
Sánchez-Garnica has written historical novels with elements of thrillers and mystery fiction. She won the Fernando Lara Novel Award with the novel Mi recuerdo es más fuerte que tu olvido (2016) and in 2021 became the runner-up for Premio Planeta de Novela with Últimos días en Berlín.

In 2016, her novel La sonata del silencio was adapted to TV as The Sonata of Silence.

Works 

 El gran arcano, 2006
 La brisa de Oriente, 2009
 El alma de las piedras, 2010
 Las tres heridas, 2012
 La sonata del silencio, 2014
 Mi recuerdo es más fuerte que tu olvido, 2016
 La Sospecha de Sofía, 2019
 Últimos días en Berlín, 2021

References 

1962 births
Living people
20th-century Spanish women writers
21st-century Spanish women writers
20th-century Spanish novelists
21st-century Spanish novelists
Writers from Madrid
People from Zaragoza